Swarz is a surname. Notable people with the surname include:

 Lou Swarz (1897–?), American actress
 Robert S. Swarz, American electrical and computer engineer
 Sahl Swarz (1912–2004), American sculptor and arts educator